Muhammad Salih Haydara (born 1952) is a Yemeni journalist and short story writer from southern Yemen. He was raised in Aden and studied communication at Cairo University. He has published several volumes of short stories including his debut collection A Wanderer from Yemen (1974), Very Much an Adolescent (1978) and Migrating Clouds (1980). His story "The Imprint of Blackness" (translated by Lorne Kenny and Thomas Ezzy) has appeared in two English-language anthologies, namely The Literature of Modern Arabia (1988) and Between the Lines: International Short Stories of War (1994).

References

Yemeni writers
1952 births
Living people
Cairo University alumni